Koyaga numisma is a species of moth of the family Noctuidae first described by Otto Staudinger in 1888. It is found in Russia, China, Korea and Japan.

The length of the forewings is 8–11 mm. The forewings are dark brown suffused with olive brown especially on medial and postmedial areas. The hindwings are white sprinkled with golden brown.

References

Moths described in 1888
Acontiinae
Moths of Japan